Wolley is a surname. Notable people with the surname include:

Elizabeth Wolley (1552–1600), English courtier
Hannah Wolley (or Wolley, 1622–1675), English writer
John Wolley (1823–1859), English naturalist
John Wolley (died 1596), English politician